AMIT (Hebrew acronym for Organization for Volunteers for Israel and Torah, English acronym for Americans for Israel and Torah, and a homonym in Hebrew for  (friend)) is an American Jewish volunteer organization providing Jewish values–based education to 37,000 children in Israel. AMIT operates 108 schools and two surrogate family residences (youth villages).

The AMIT Network was selected by Israel’s Ministry of Education as the leading Jewish educational network across all measurements, including quality bagrut, pedagogical innovation, pluralism and bridging the gap, lowest dropout rate and integrity.

AMIT has raised bagrut scores across the reshet (“network”), and it has significantly increased the number of students studying math, physics, science and technology subjects at the highest levels. AMIT graduates maintain a high level of military service or national service (95%), and they enter the army and the workforce equipped to meet the challenges of the 21st century.

AMIT maintains a balance of 70% of its schools in Israel’s periphery (disadvantaged areas) and 30% in the more affluent center of Israel. When new schools are admitted to the network, this balance is maintained. On June 14, 2020, they have organized a Virtual Tour of Israel where they have presented the first National Mother-in-Israel.

History 

AMIT was founded on May 10, 1925 by Bessie Gotsfeld, and was then known as the Mizrachi Women's Organization of America. It officially incorporated on October 2, 1930. As early as 1934, AMIT was resettling young people from Europe in Palestine. By the years immediately following the end of the war in Europe, AMIT participated in the resettlement of thousands of children, many of them orphans, who survived the Holocaust.

The Holocaust survivers were followed by the large influx of Jews from North Africa and the Arab countries in 1948-49, when AMIT dealt with the pressing needs of tens of thousands of newly arrived immigrant children.

In 1981, AMIT was designated by the Israeli government as its official Reshet (network) for religious secondary technological education.

AMIT today 
AMIT operates 108 schools, youth villages, surrogate family residences and other programs, constituting Israel’s only government-recognized network of religious Jewish education incorporating academic and technological studies. AMIT students boast an 85% (bagrut) matriculation rate, exceeding the national average of 70% among Israeli Jewish students. More than 95% of its graduates enlist in the Israel Defense Forces or perform national service.

List of AMIT schools

Archival materials 

The American Jewish Historical Society received a large donation of archival material and photographs related to AMIT and the organization's projects in Israel. The collection was minimally processed over the Summer 2011 and is available for research.

Photographs and materials relating to the Baltimore chapters' history are archived at the Jewish Museum of Maryland and can be viewed through their online collections.

See also 
 Education in Israel
 Ministry of Education (Israel)
 Religious Zionism#Educational institutions
 Other school networks recognized by the Ministry of Education:
 Amal
 Bnei Akiva
 ORT
 Or Torah
 Tzvia

References

External links 
 http://www.amitchildren.org/
 https://web.archive.org/web/20120415134524/http://amitchildren.org/who-we-are/amit-history/
 AMIT records; I-521; American Jewish Historical Society, New York, NY, and Boston, MA.

Charities based in New York (state)
Jewish organizations based in the United States
Zionist organizations
Zionism in the United States
1925 establishments in the United States
1925 establishments in Mandatory Palestine
Educational organizations based in Israel
Foreign charities operating in Israel
Jewish educational organizations
International Jewish organizations